Maycoll Cañizalez-Smith (born 28 December 1982) is a Canadian former professional soccer player who played as an attacking midfielder.

Club career
Cañizalez was born in Quezaltepeque, El Salvador and raised in Toronto, Ontario.

He played in Germany for Werder Bremen and Hannover 96 reserve sides before signing with Toronto FC in April 2007. Cañizalez became the first Canadian to score a league goal at BMO Field, getting off the mark against Columbus Crew on 22 September 2007. Toronto waived him at the end of the 2007 season.

Following his time in Toronto, Cañizales returned to Germany, having successful seasons earning playing time at Bonner SC, Fortuna Köln, SV Roßbach/Verscheid and VfB Oldenburg.

International career
Cañizalez played at the 2001 FIFA World Youth Championship in Argentina, alongside Atiba Hutchinson and Mike Klukowski among others.

He made his senior debut for Canada in a January 2003 friendly match against the United States. He earned a total of five caps, scoring one goal. His final international was a July 2003 Gold Cup match against Cuba.

Career statistics

Club

International goals
Scores and results list Canada's goal tally first, score column indicates score after each Cañizalez goal.

References

External links

1982 births
Living people
People from Quezaltepeque
Soccer players from Toronto
Canadian people of Salvadoran descent
Salvadoran emigrants to Canada
Naturalized citizens of Canada
Association football midfielders
Canadian soccer players
Canada men's international soccer players
Canada men's youth international soccer players
Canada men's under-23 international soccer players
2003 CONCACAF Gold Cup players
Regionalliga players
Major League Soccer players
SV Werder Bremen II players
Hannover 96 II players
FC Oberneuland players
Toronto FC players
Bonner SC players
SC Fortuna Köln players
VfB Oldenburg players
SSV Jeddeloh players
Canadian expatriate soccer players
Canadian expatriate sportspeople in Germany
Expatriate footballers in Germany